Amanda Pascoe (born 31 October 1984) is an Australian freestyle swimmer.

Career
Pascoe first competed for Australia at the 2000 Oceania Swimming Championships in Christchurch where she won gold in the 400-metre freestyle in 4:20.46 and with Heidi Crawford, Tammie Smith and Joy Symons won gold in the 4 × 200-metre freestyle relay in 8:24.69. In both events new championships record times were set. Pascoe also won silver in 4 × 100-metre freestyle relay with Crawford, Brooke Townsend and Carmen Cosgrove in 3:55.46, and won bronze in the 200-metre freestyle in 2:04.89 and bronze 800-metre freestyle in 8:56.83.

At the 2001 World Championships in Fukuoka, Japan, Pascoe finished 4th in the 1500 metre freestyle in 16:16.80 and 12th in the 800-metre freestyle in 8:43.79.

At the 2001–02 FINA Swimming World Cup event in Melbourne, Pascoe won the 800-metre freestyle in 8:21.27, finished 5th in the 400-metre freestyle in 4:05.28 and 12th in the 200-metre freestyle in 2:02.13. At the event in Paris, Pascoe won the 800-metre freestyle in 8:19.54 and was runner up in the 400-metre freestyle in 4:07.13. In Stockholm, Pascoe won the 800-metre freestyle in 8:23.99, finished 3rd in the 400-metre freestyle in 4:08.70 and 14th in the 200-metre freestyle in 2:03.23. At the final event in Berlin, Pascoe won the 800-metre freestyle for the fourth time in 8:17.64, finished runner up in 400-metre freestyle in 4:05.42 and 21st in 200-metre freestyle in 2:02.35.

At the 2002 FINA World Swimming Championships (25 m) in Moscow, Pascoe with Giaan Rooney, Clementine Stoney and Lori Munz finished 4th in the heats of the 4 × 200-metre freestyle relay. In the final, Pascoe and Stoney were replaced with Elka Graham and Petria Thomas who won bronze with a time of 7:49.50. In other results, Pascoe finished 6th both the 400 and the 800-metre freestyle events with times of 4:08.68 and 8:29.98 respectively.

At the 2002 Commonwealth Games in Manchester, Pascoe won silver in the 800-metre freestyle in 8:34.19 and finished 5th in the 400-metre freestyle in 4:14.74.

At the 2002 Pan Pacific Swimming Championships in Yokohama, Japan, Pascoe finished 5th in the 400-metre freestyle in 4:13.33, 6th in the 800-metre freestyle in 8:39.89 and 7th in the 1500 metre freestyle in 16:46.84.

At the 2003 Duel in the Pool between United States and Australia in Indianapolis, Pascoe finished 3rd in the 800-metre freestyle in 8:37.52.

At the 2003 World Championships in Barcelona, Pascoe finished 14th in the 800-metre freestyle in 16:38.70 and 15th in the 800-metre freestyle in 8:42.27.

References

1984 births
Living people
Australian female freestyle swimmers
Commonwealth Games silver medallists for Australia
Swimmers at the 2002 Commonwealth Games
Medalists at the FINA World Swimming Championships (25 m)
Commonwealth Games medallists in swimming
Place of birth missing (living people)
21st-century Australian women
20th-century Australian women
Medallists at the 2002 Commonwealth Games